Grandma, What Great Songs You Sang! is the debut studio album by American singer Brenda Lee. The album was released on August 3, 1959 on Decca Records and was produced by Owen Bradley. The album was Brenda Lee's only studio album released during the 1950s.

Background and content 
Grandma, What Great Songs You Sang! was recorded in two separate sessions in January 1959 at the Bradley Film & Recording Studio. The sessions took place on January 4 and January 26. The album consisted of twelve separate tracks of material, many of which were cover versions of previously recorded songs. The opening track entitled "Some of These Days", written by Shelton Brooks, was originally composed in 1910 and the second track entitled "Baby Face" was first recorded in 1926. The album was originally released on an LP record, which contained six songs on each side of the record.in 1961 it was rerelased with a new title but same catalog number as Sings Songs Everybody Knows and in 1968 on Vocalion Records a Decca subsiderary as Here's Brenda minus 2 songs

Grandma, What Great Songs You Sang! received three and a half out of five stars from AllMusic without an official review provided.

Track listing 
Side one
"Some of These Days" – (Shelton Brooks) - 2:23
"Baby Face" – (Harry Akst, Benny Davis) - 2:15
"A Good Man Is Hard to Find" – (Eddie Green) - 2:27
"Just Because" – (Bob Shelton, Joe Shelton, Sid Robin) - 1:57
"Pennies from Heaven" – (Johnny Burke, Arthur Johnston) - 2:25
"Toot, Toot, Tootsie Goodbye" – (Ernie Erdman, Ted Fiorito, Gus Kahn, Dan Russo) - 2:20

Side two
"Ballin' the Jack" – (Jim Burris, Chris Smith) - 1:55
"Rock-a-Bye Your Baby with a Dixie Melody" - (Sam M. Lewis, Jean Schwartz, Joe Young) - 2:26
"Pretty Baby" – (Tony Jackson) - 1:42
"Side by Side" – (Harry M. Woods) - 2:12
"Back in Your Own Backyard" – (Al Jolson, Billy Rose, Dave Dreyer) - 2:50
"St. Louis Blues" – (W.C. Handy) - 2:54

Personnel 

 Harold Bradley – guitar
 Floyd Cramer – piano
 Ray Edenton – guitar
 Dottie Dillard – background vocals
 James Doster – trombone
 Hank Garland – guitar
 Dutch Gorton – trombone
 Jack Gregory – saxophone
 Buddy Harman – drums
 Anita Kerr – background vocals
 Douglas Kirkham – background vocals, drums
 Millie Kirkham – background vocals
 Brenda Lee – lead vocals
 Baverly LeCroy – trombone
 Grady Martin – guitar
 Bob Moore – bass
 Gene Mullins – trombone
 Louis Nunley – background vocals
 Boots Randolph – saxophone
 Bill Wright – background vocals

References 

1959 debut albums
Brenda Lee albums
Albums produced by Owen Bradley
Decca Records albums